Jonathan Zipf (born 20 June 1986 in Herbolzheim-Broggingen) is a German professional triathlete and silver medalist of the 2005 Junior World Championships. In 2010 he was number 31 in the ITU World Championship Series Ranking.

Jonathan Zipf is a member of the military Sportförderung Mainz (Sports Promotion Mainz) High Performance Centre (military rank: Stabsunteroffizier). Until 2010, Zipf represented the German elite club Hansgrohe Team Schwarzwald. Since January 2011, Zipf has represented the EJOT Team TV Buschhütten in the German Bundesliga circuit. In 2010, Zipf also represented the French club Lagardère Paris Racing in the French Club Championship Series Lyonnaise des Eaux. At Beauvais, the only triathlon of this French circuit Zipf attended, he placed 14th and thus was the second best of his club.

ITU competitions 
In the eight years from 2003 to 2010, Zipf took part in 32 ITU competitions and achieved 13 top ten positions. The following list is based upon the official ITU rankings and the athlete's profile page.

Unless indicated otherwise, the following events are triathlons (Olympic Distance) and belong to the Elite category.

BG = the sponsor British Gas
DNF = Did not finish

Notes

External links 
 Zipf's club EJOT 

German male triathletes
1986 births
Living people